Resorts World Sentosa (abbreviation: RWS) is an integrated resort on the island of Sentosa, which is located off the southern coast of Singapore. The key attractions within RWS include one of Singapore's two casinos, a Universal Studios Singapore theme park, which is the second Universal Studios theme park in Asia after Universal Studios Japan and the first in Southeast Asia, the Adventure Cove Waterpark, as well as the S.E.A. Aquarium, which is the world's second largest oceanarium.

First conceived in 2006, the S$6.59 billion (US$5.03 billion) resort was developed by Genting Singapore, and construction began in 2007. It was the third most expensive building ever constructed when it was completed 2010. The soft launch of the first four hotels took place on 20 January 2010, with the FestiveWalk shopping mall following on 1 February.

The casino began operations on 14 February 2010 on the first day of the Chinese New Year. The Maritime Experiential Museum opened on 15 October 2011 and the last attraction opened on 22 November 2012, known as The Marine Life Park. The grand opening of the entire integrated resort was held on 7 December 2012, which was officiated by the country's Prime Minister Lee Hsien Loong together with Genting Group Chairman Lim Kok Thay. Resorts World Sentosa is also capable of holding large-scale exhibitions.

History

Construction
Construction of Resorts World Sentosa Singapore began on 16 April 2007 on the demolished plot of Imbiah Lookout. It opened after 34 months of construction on 20 January 2010.
Crockfords Tower, Hard Rock Hotel Singapore, Festive Hotel and Hotel Michael opened 20 January 2010, followed by FestiveWalk on 31 January 2010. Resorts World Sentosa Casino opened on 14 February 2010.

Opening
Universal Studios Singapore was opened for a sneak peek week in view of the Chinese New Year Celebrations, from 5 pm to 9 pm every night between 14 and 21 February 2010. The whole park was opened but none of the rides was operational. Visitors had to pay SGD10 to get into the park. Park tickets for the week were sold out in 2 days. The park had its soft opening period from 18 March 2010 to 26 October 2010.

COVID-19
As a result of the global COVID-19 pandemic, Resorts World Sentosa had to temporarily lay off a significant amount of its workforce.

Resort layout

The resort was designed primarily by the Driehaus Prize winner and New Classical architect Michael Graves. The six hotels offer a total of 1,840 rooms for accommodation. Each hotel is designed with a different theme, catering to both leisure and business visitors.
The resort is split into the west, central and east zones.

Central zone

Hotels
Four hotels are located in the central zone.
 Crockfords Tower, formerly planned to be named Maxims Tower, is an 11-storey all-suite hotel overlooking the Singapore harbour and the Southern Islands. The resort's casino is located beneath the tower. The hotel was topped-out on 27 February 2009 and opened on 20 January 2010. Both the latter and Hotel Michael sit on the area of the former Sentosa Musical Fountain The hotel also features Crockfords Premier, a casino club with private rooms for High Roller located on 10th floor.
 Hotel Michael is an 11-story hotel named after Michael Graves. Hotel Michael topped-out on 15 July 2009 and was opened on 20 January 2010. Together with Crockfords Tower, it replaces the site of former Sentosa Musical Fountain
 Festive Hotel is a family-oriented hotel next to Crockfords Tower and Festive Walk. Beneath the hotel is Festive Grand, a 1,600 seat plenary hall which will host Resorts World Sentosa's resident musical Voyage de la Vie.
 The Hard Rock Hotel Singapore is the site of meeting and conference facilities and indoor exhibition space. This includes 26 differently-designed function rooms and one of Asia's largest ballrooms with seating for 7,300 guests. Construction of Singapore's first Hard Rock Hotel started in May 2008, and the hotel opened on 20 January 2010.
 Equarius Hotel is situated at the west of the resort.
The Royal Albatross is berthed at the Historical Ships Harbour, beside S.E.A Aquarium and the Adventure Cove Waterpark.

Casino

Resorts World Sentosa casino is located beneath Crockfords Tower that has an acreage of 15,000 sq.m.

In May 2011, the Casino Regulatory Authority fined Resorts World Sentosa for two violations related to reimbursements and two other violations related to surveillance practices. The total fine was S$530,000 (US$425,000).

West zone

Hotels
 Equarius Hotel, close to the Adventure Cove Waterpark.
 Beach Villas, a collection of 22 villas floating on a lagoon. It opened on 16 February 2012.

Marine Life Park

Marine Life Park, the world's largest oceanarium, opened its doors on 22 November 2012. The park houses two attractions, the S.E.A Aquarium and the Adventure Cove Waterpark, previously known as the Equarius Water Park.

The Maritime Experiential Museum

The Maritime Experiential Museum was opened on 15 October 2011 that features more than 400 artifacts and replicas with a 360-degree Multi-sensory Typhoon Theatre. It displays the history of ancient maritime trade: visitors have the opportunity to immerse themselves in the history of the maritime Silk Route from the 15th to 19th century. The museum consists of more than 10 interactive points as well as an opportunity to board the authentic harbor ships from Asia docked outside the museum. Also, it will become the permanent home of the Jewel of Muscat, a gift from the Oman Government. It was closed along with the Crane Dance on 2 March 2020.

Royal Albatross

The Royal Albatross is berthed at the Historical Ships Harbour, beside the Aquarium and the Adventure Cove Waterpark. The ship is available twice every weekend. Its route goes through the beaches of Sentosa to the outskirts of Marina Bay, around the edge of the Southern Islands and back to Sentosa.

East zone

Universal Studios Singapore

Universal Studios Singapore is Southeast Asia's first Universal Studios theme park and the second in all of Asia. It opened its doors on 18 March 2010. It features 24 attractions and is divided into seven zones – including Sci-Fi City, Ancient Egypt, New York, The Lost World, Far Far Away, Madagascar and Hollywood.

See also
 Adventure Cove Waterpark
 Royal Albatross

References

External links
 

 
2010 establishments in Singapore
Casinos completed in 2010
Casinos in Singapore
Hotel buildings completed in 2010
Hotels in Singapore
Michael Graves buildings
Resorts in Singapore
Sentosa
Southern Islands
Tourist attractions in Singapore
New Classical architecture